Private Party Collectors Edition is the debut compilation album of Canadian DJ group, Baby Blue Soundcrew, released on December 5, 2000. The album features 24 popular urban songs of 2000, including five original songs by Baby Blue Soundcrew. In Canada, the album was just shy of platinum status, selling just under 100,000 copies.

Music videos were released for "Money Jane", "Too Much", and "You've Changed". "Money Jane" and "Only Be in Love" were nominated for Juno Awards in 2001.

Track listing

Chart positions

Year-end

References

Albums produced by Kardinal Offishall
Albums produced by Saukrates
Baby Blue Soundcrew albums
Compilation albums by Canadian artists
2000 debut albums
2000 compilation albums